is a railway station in the town of Noheji, Kamikita District, Aomori Prefecture, Japan, operated by East Japan Railway Company (JR East).

Lines
Arito Station is served by the Ōminato Line, and is located 9.6 kilometers from the terminus of the line at Noheji Station.

Station layout
The station has a single ground-level side platform serving a single bidirectional track. There is no station building, but only a small rain shelter for passengers on the platform. The station is unattended.

History
Arito Station was opened on March 20, 1921, as a station on the Japanese Government Railways (JGR). Freight services were discontinued on March 15, 1972. With the privatization of the Japanese National Railways (JNR) on April 1, 1987, it came under the operational control of JR East.

Surrounding area
Mutsu Bay

See also
 List of Railway Stations in Japan

External links

Railway stations in Aomori Prefecture
Ōminato Line
Railway stations in Japan opened in 1921
Noheji, Aomori